Kayden William Troff (born May 6, 1998) is an American chess grandmaster. He was World U14 Chess Champion in 2012.

Personal life

Troff lives in West Jordan, Utah with his parents, Kim and Daniel, sister Brynndi, and brothers Jeremy and Zachary Troff.

Early years 

He first demonstrated chess ability at the age of three; having learned to play by watching his father.  When Troff turned six, he spent a week training with Grandmaster Igor Ivanov. He has also been trained by Melikset Khachiyan and Alexander Chernin.

Troff first won a Utah State Elementary Championship at the age of six and won first place in his section in the Utah State Elementary Championship each year after.

In December 2007 he was named to the United States Chess Federation's 2008 All America Chess Team and at age 10, he was named to the 2010 All America Chess Team, an honor described as "one of the highest national honors attainable by a young chess player". On December 14, 2008, he won second place at the fifth-grade level at the National K-12 Championships.

In 2009, Troff won the Utah Speed Chess Championship at age ten, becoming the youngest player to win that event. This was followed up by becoming Utah G/60 Champion. the youngest player to do so. After this win, the tournament director dubbed him "Utah's Mozart of Chess." He also won the 2009 North American Youth Championship for under 12s in Mazatlán.

Troff's quick rating was the highest of all US players under the age of 13 according to the Top 100 rating list published by the USCF from June 2009 through October 2010. In May 2010 he defeated Harold Stevens, Utah's then highest-rated player, in a match, winning all three games. In October 2010 he won the Utah Open tournament.

Notable accomplishments

Troff won the world championship for ages 14 and under in Maribor, Slovenia, in 2012.
He also won the silver medal for ages 12 and under at the World Youth Chess Championships in Greece in 2010, behind Wei Yi.

Having already obtained the three GM Norms needed, he reached 2500 Elo rating to earn the Grandmaster title at the Saint Louis Invitational in May 2014, at age 16.

In June 2014, Troff became US Junior Chess Champion scoring 7/9 points.

References

External links
 
 Kayden Troff member profile at Chess.com (archived)
 United States Chess Federation ratings (enter Troff into search box)
 The Salt Lake Tribune Today in Photos feature on Kayden Troff

1998 births
Living people
Chess grandmasters
American chess players
People from West Jordan, Utah